Henry John Martin (1830-1903) was Archdeacon of Lindisfarne  from 1882 until his death.

Martin was born in South Devon and educated King's College School   and Trinity College, Cambridge. He was ordained by the Bishop of Oxford in 1855 and began his ecclesiastical career with curacies in Shirburn and Exeter. After this he was association secretary of the Church Missionary Society from 1862 to 1866 when he became Vicar of West Hartlepool. In 1871 he became Vicar of Newcastle-upon-Tyne where he stayed for eleven years until his Archdeacon’s appointment.

References

1830 births
Clergy from Devon
People educated at King's College School, London
Alumni of Trinity College, Cambridge
Archdeacons of Lindisfarne
1903 deaths